Gina Gabrielle Starr (born 1974) is an American literary scholar, neuroscientist, and academic administrator who is the 10th president of Pomona College, a liberal arts college in Claremont, California. She is known for her work on 18th-century British literature and the neuroscience of aesthetics. She is the recipient of a Guggenheim Fellowship, an NSF ADVANCE award (joint with Nava Rubin), and a New Directions Fellowship from the Mellon Foundation. From 2000 to 2017, she was on the faculty at New York University. In 2017, she became the first woman and first African-American president of Pomona College. Starr was elected a member of the American Academy of Arts and Sciences in 2020.

Early life and education 
Starr grew up in Tallahassee, Florida. She began college at Emory University at age 15, where she earned her bachelor's and master's degrees in women's studies in 1993. She then studied at the University of St Andrews in Scotland as a Robert T. Jones Scholar. From there, she earned a Ph.D. in English literature from Harvard University in 1999.

Career 
After receiving her doctorate, Starr decided to retrain in cognitive neuroscience, supported by a New Directions Fellowship awarded by the Andrew W. Mellon Foundation. She completed a postdoctoral fellowship at the California Institute of Technology, exploring techniques from cognitive neuroscience.

She joined the faculty at New York University (NYU) in 2000 and became the acting dean of the College of Arts and Science in 2011 and dean suo jure in 2013.

With Susanne Wofford and faculty at NYU, in 2015 Starr co-founded a liberal arts prison education program at Wallkill Correctional Facility in New York State. In addition, Starr, in collaboration with the Borough of Manhattan Community College, initiated a STEM preparation and transfer program, P.O.I.S.E., to provide promising students with support, mentorship, and financial access to encourage them to undertake a bachelor's degree in STEM subjects at NYU.

In 2016 she was selected to be the 10th President of Pomona College, a position she assumed on July 1, 2017. She is a proponent of affirmative action. , her yearly compensation was valued at $.

Research 
Starr's research is highly interdisciplinary, combining literary scholarship, empirical aesthetics, psychology, and cognitive neuroscience. Her most recent book, Feeling Beauty, proposes a neural model of aesthetic experience that relies on a network of interconnected neural structures. Feeling Beauty was shortlisted for the Christian Gauss Award of Phi Beta Kappa in 2014. Her current research uses functional magnetic resonance imaging to understand the neural basis of aesthetic experiences, providing evidence that the default mode network is involved in the representation of aesthetic appeal. She has published articles in journals including Modern Philology, Eighteenth-Century Fiction, Eighteenth-Century Studies, Proceedings of the National Academy of Sciences, Cognition, Neuron, NeuroImage, and Psychology of Aesthetics, Creativity, and the Arts.

References 

Presidents of Pomona College
New York University faculty
American neuroscientists
Pomona College faculty
1974 births
Living people
Emory University alumni
Harvard University alumni
Literary scholars
Fellows of the American Academy of Arts and Sciences
American academic administrators
Women heads of universities and colleges
Heads of universities and colleges in the United States
African-American academics
American literary historians
American academics of English literature
Historians from California
21st-century African-American people
20th-century African-American people